Perry Township is one of fourteen townships in Miami County, Indiana, United States. As of the 2010 census, its population was 864 and it contained 343 housing units.

History
The first settlement at Perry Township was made in 1833. Perry Township was organized in 1837. The township is named for Oliver Hazard Perry, best known for his heroic role in the War of 1812 during the Battle of Lake Erie.

Geography

Unincorporated towns
 Gilead at

Extinct towns
 Hooversburg
 Niconza

Cemeteries
The township contains these five cemeteries: Gilead, Enterprise, Gaerte, Shoemaker and Tilden.

School districts
 North Miami Community Schools

Political districts
 Indiana's 5th congressional district
 State House District 23
 State Senate District 18

References
 
 United States Census Bureau 2008 TIGER/Line Shapefiles
 IndianaMap

External links
 Indiana Township Association
 United Township Association of Indiana
 City-Data.com page for Perry Township

Townships in Miami County, Indiana
Townships in Indiana